Ragas Dental College & Hospital commonly called "RDC Chennai", is a dental college located at the outskirts  of Chennai, India. It is affiliated to The Tamil Nadu Dr. M.G.R. Medical University. It was founded by Dr. B.P. Rajan, a conservative dentist, in 1987 in Radhakrishnan Road, Chennai. Its first Dean was Dr. Vasanta Rao.

Programs

Academic programs offered include:
 Undergraduate Studies (Bachelor of Dental Surgery Program), a five-year program, including one year of compulsory rotatory internship
 Post Graduate Studies (Master of Dental Surgery Program), two-year programs in Orthodontics, Prosthodontics, Pedodontics, Periodontics, Oral and maxillofacial surgery, Conservative Dentistry (involving the preservation of natural teeth), Oral Pathology, and Oral medicine & Radiology Community Dentistry
 Doctoral Studies (Ph.D. Program), a research program in the field or sub-fields of dentistry

The college also offers Diploma Programs in Dental Hygiene and Dental Mechanic.

References

External links

Dental colleges in India
Universities and colleges in Chennai